Fade Out is the second album by British alternative rock band Loop. This album was more commercially successful than its predecessor, reaching #1 on the UK Indie Charts and peaking at #51 on the official UK album charts.

Track listing

Charts

References

1988 albums
Loop (band) albums